Panti Rapih Hospital (Rumah Sakit Panti Rapih) is a private hospital in Yogyakarta, Indonesia. It was founded in 1929 by five sisters from St. Carolus Borromeus. It is managed by Panti Rapih Foundation.

History

In January 1929, five sisters from St. Carolus Borromeus came in Yogyakarta to serve the sick people. They are Sr. Gaudentia Brand, Sr. Yudith de Laat, Sr. Ignatia Lemmens, Sr. Simonia, and Sr. Ludolpha de Groot. With the help from Ir. Schmutzer, a hospital was built.

The foundation stone was laid by C.T.M.Schmutzer van Rijckevorsel on September 15, 1928 and the building work was finished in August 1929. On August 25, 1929, the building was blessed by Mgr. Van Velsen, S.J. and on September 14, 1929 the hospital was opened by Sultan Hamengkubuwono VIII as Onder de Bogen Hospital. The building was designed by AIA, one of the largest architect consultant in the Dutch Indies.

A few years later, Sultan Hamengkubuwono VIII presented the hospital with an ambulance. The building was similar to St. Carolus Borromeus Main Monastery in Maastricht, the Netherlands. The sisters ministered the sick people based on the Gospel teaching.

More and more patients came to the hospital. Some of the patients were Dutch and sultanate bureaucrats. To help the poor, a clinic for the poor was built with the help from Bruder FIC Congregation.

In 1942, the Japanese came and the hospital management became worse and worse. The Dutch sisters were sent to the camps and the hospital was taken over by the Japanese. During this time, Sr. Sponsaria was chosen as the president, and Moeder Yvonne was chosen as CB Sisters leader in Indonesia. Because the Dutch name was forbidden, the hospital name was changed into Panti Rapih which meant 'healing hospital'. The new name was given by the Semarang Archbishop, Mgr. Sugiyopranoto, S.J.

After the Japanese era, the CB Sisters came back to the hospital and took care the Indonesian soldiers, including Indonesian Armed Forces Commander in Chief, General Sudirman.

President
The current president is Dr. St. Arif Haliman, M.Ph.

Location
The hospital was located in Cik Ditiro Street, in front of Universitas Gadjah Mada main entrance.

References

External links
 Official website

Hospital buildings completed in 1929
Hospitals in Indonesia
Buildings and structures in Yogyakarta
Hospitals established in 1929